Andhra Pradesh Day (Telugu: ఆంధ్రప్రదేశ్ అవతరణ దినోత్సవము). The Andhra State was merged with Hyderabad State on this day. It is celebrated annually on 1st November to commemorate the implentation of States Reorganisation Act in the states of Andhra and Hyderabad.

Indian state foundation days